The Midland Hotel, or Midland Railroad Hotel, at 414 26th St. in Wilson, Kansas, was built in 1899.  It was listed on the National Register of Historic Places in 2002.

It was opened as the Power Hotel in 1899.  It is a three-story native limestone building.  It has a mansard roof, which is perhaps a nod to the Second Empire style which was popular during 1855–1885;  the third floor is entirely within a straight angled mansard roof profile.

References

External links

Hotels in Kansas		
National Register of Historic Places in Ellsworth County, Kansas
Victorian architecture in Kansas
Buildings and structures completed in 1899